Statistics of the Primera División de México for the 1984–85 season.

Overview
It was contested by 20 teams, and América won the championship.

On August 20, 1984, the Mexican Football Federation accepted the request of C.F. Oaxtepec. to move to Puebla, for this reason, the club changed its name to Ángeles de Puebla.

Zacatepec was promoted from Segunda División, also, this team was relegated on this season.

Teams

Group stage

Group 1

Group 2

Group 3

Group 4

Results

Relegation playoff
Zacatepec 1-2 ; 0-1 Necaxa

Playoff

Championship Playoff Game

References
Mexico - List of final tables (RSSSF)

Liga MX seasons
Mex
1984–85 in Mexican football